Platythelys is a genus of flowering plants from the orchid family, Orchidaceae. The species are widespread across much of Latin America and the West Indies. There are reports of the genus in the southeastern United States, but the accuracy of the identifications has been questioned.

See also 
 List of Orchidaceae genera

References 

 Berg Pana, H. 2005. Handbuch der Orchideen-Namen. Dictionary of Orchid Names. Dizionario dei nomi delle orchidee. Ulmer, Stuttgart

External links 

Cranichideae genera
Goodyerinae